Barora Area is one of the 12 operational areas of BCCL located in Dhanbad Sadar subdivision of Dhanbad district in the state of Jharkhand, India.

Geography

Location
The Barora Area is at the western end of Jharia coalfield.

The map alongside shows some of the collieries in the Area. However, as the collieries do not have individual pages, there are no links in the full screen map.

Mining activity
Muraidih colliery is a mixed mine having both underground and open cast mines. The colliery has an open cast section with hired arrangements for extraction of overburden and transportation of coal. Shatabdi OCP was carved out of Muraidih colliery in 2000 and later amalgamated with Muraidih colliery in 2014. A private company was used for operating underground mine in seam I & III using continuous miner. It has a reserve of 115 million tonnes. 
Damoda colliery is the only functional colliery of BCCL located in Bokaro district. It has two underground mines – one pit and one incline, and two open cast mines – one departmental and one operated with hired equipment. It has a reserve of 17.8 million tonnes.
Phularitand colliery is a mixed mine with both underground and open cast mines. Earlier, the underground mine was out of operation but from 2014 two inclines have started producing. It has a reserve of 116.06 million tonnes. 
Madhuband colliery is an underground mine with a reserve of 286.6 million tonnes.

Mining plan
An overview of the proposed mining activity plan in Cluster I, Cluster II and Cluster XV as of 2012, is as follows:

1.Muraidih colliery, consisting of both underground and open cast mines, has a normative production capacity of 5.50 million tonnes per year and a peak production capacity of 7.15 million tonnes per year. Shatabdi open cast project has a normative production capacity of 1.4 million tonnes per year and a peak production capacity of 1.82 million tonnes per year.

2. Damoda colliery has three units – Albion section, underground mine and BJ section (proposed open cast mine). The Albion section has a normative production capacity of 0.20 million tonnes per year and a peak production capacity of 0.26 million tonnes per year. The underground mine has a normative production capacity of 0.10 million tonnes per year and a peak production capacity of 0.13 million tonnes per year. The BJ section has a normative production capacity of 0.60 million tonnes per year and a peak production capacity of 0.78 million tonnes per year.

3. Phularitand open cast mine has a normative production capacity of 3 million tonnes per year and a peak production capacity of 3.90 million tonnes per year. It had an expected life of over 18 years. Phularitand underground mine has a normative production capacity  of 0.120 million tonnes per year and a peak production capacity of 0.156 million tonnes per year. It had an expected life of over 30 years.

4. Madhuband colliery with an underground mine has a normative production capacity of 0.113 million tonnes per year and a peak production capacity of 0.147 million tonnes per year. It had an expected life of over 30 years.

References

Coal mining operational areas in Jharkhand